

Settlement History (1760-1939) 
Sandyfield was a settlement of about 30 houses in the Town of Ramapo in Rockland County, New York, United States, that was submerged when swampy Beaver Pond was dammed to create  Lake Welch in Harriman State Park by the Palisades Interstate Park Commission in 1928.

The hamlet was settled in about 1760 along the road from Stony Point to Central Valley; the road is now a hiking trail called the Hasenclever Road.  In 1910, when the state park was created, the residents were notified that they would have to leave their homes; there was an attempt to resist through political channels, but in 1939 the last residents were ordered to leave.  By 1942, the lake was completed using workers from the Civilian Conservation Corps that was building the park.  The new lake was named in honor of William A. Welch the first chairman of the Palisades Interstate Park Commission that built Harriman.

Lake Welch (1942-present) 
After completion of the lake dam, Lake Welch Beach opened to the public. Featuring a half-mile beachwalk and 2,500 space parking lots, the beach is the largest in the Palisades Region with almost a half million visitors in 2020. Every winter, the lake is drained about 20 feet to reclaim sand lost to the water. 

The beach can be accessed from Exit 16 on the Palisades Interstate Parkway via Lake Welch Drive (closed winters) or County Route 106.

Adjacent to the lake is Beaver Pond Campground, one of two state run overnight areas in the park. There are over 100 platform/ground camping sites with facilities but no connections for RVs.

Sources
Myles, William J., Harriman Trails, A Guide and History, New York-New Jersey Trail Conference, New York, N.Y., 1999.

Former populated places in Rockland County, New York
Harriman State Park (New York)
Hamlets in Rockland County, New York